Gilson may refer to:

Places
Gilson, Warwickshire, a hamlet in Warwickshire, England
Gilson, Illinois, a village in the United States
Gilson Butte in Utah, a United States rocket launching site

Other uses
Gilson (name)
Gilson (footballer, born 1973), Macedonian football defensive midfielder
Gilson (footballer, born 1991), Santomean football defender
Gilson (basketball) (born 1956), Brazilian basketball players
Gilson, a common type of pipette
Gilson College, a Seventh-day Adventist School on the outskirts of Melbourne, Australia
Gilson Brothers Co., a manufacturer of outdoor power equipment